Amblyseius spiculatus is a species of mite in the family Phytoseiidae.

References

spiculatus
Articles created by Qbugbot
Animals described in 1973